Omanoor is a village in the Malappuram district, Kerala, India.
The village is in Cheekode Panchayath.  There have LP, UP, HSS in this village, and most of the people are daily workers. Omanoor has many historical mythologies.

Location
Omanoor is located on the main road from Kondotty to Edavannappara.

Villages and suburbs
 Neerad, Muthuvalloor and Moochikkal
 Jalaliyya Nagar, Mundakkulam and Vettukadu
 Parathakkad, Cheekkode and Pallipuraya
 Kacherithadam, Ponnad and Kolambalam

Important institutions in Omanoor 
Brothers kodakkad,omanoor
Omanoor Suhada Islamic Complex(https://www.facebook.com/shuhadaomanoor/)
Govt. vetinery Hospital
Govt. Primary Health Centre
Govt. Vocational Higher Secondary school
Village Office
Govt. Homeo Hospital
Maveli store
Kerala Gramin Bank
Cheekode service cooperative bank
Misriya women's college, Omanur
AMLPS omanur
UAHMUPS Omanur
TMSEM LPS Omanur

Transportation
Omanoor village connects to other parts of India through Feroke town on the west and Nilambur town on the east.  National highway No.66 passes through Kondotty and the northern stretch connects to Goa and Mumbai.  The southern stretch connects to Cochin and Trivandrum.  State Highway No.28 starts from Nilambur and connects to Ooty, Mysore and Bangalore through Highways.12,29 and 181. The nearest airport is at Kozhikode.  There is no railway station near to omanoor in less than 10 km. How ever Kozhikode and Feroke are the major railway station which is almost 22 KM near to Omanoor 

Nearest Bus station  Kondotty. and Edavannappara

Airport: Calicut international airport is 10KMs Away from Omanoor

See also
 Kondotty
 Mukkam
 Mavoor
 Edavannappara
 Edavanna
 Areekode
kodakkad

Image gallery

References

Villages in Malappuram district
Kondotty area